Kikvidze is a rural locality (a khutor) in Khopyorskoye Rural Settlement, Novonikolayevsky District, Volgograd Oblast, Russia. The population was 265 as of 2010. There are 11 streets.

Geography 
Kikvidze is located on the Khopyorsko-Buzulukskaya Plain, on the left bank of the Kardail River, 38 km southeast of Novonikolayevsky (the district's administrative centre) by road. Nizhnekardailsky is the nearest rural locality.

References 

Rural localities in Novonikolayevsky District